Okina may refer to:

 ʻOkina, a letter used in some Polynesian languages, visually resembling a left single quotation mark
 Okina, Spain, a village in the Basque Country
 , a particular Japanese Noh, combining play/dance with Shinto ritual
 , a Japanese satellite of the lunar orbiter SELENE (better known in Japan by its nickname Kaguya)